Andreas Eines Hopmark (born 6 July 1991) is a Norwegian footballer who plays for Eliteserien club Kristiansund.

Career statistics

References

1991 births
Living people
Sportspeople from Kristiansund
Norwegian footballers
Eliteserien players
Norwegian First Division players
Kristiansund BK players
Association football defenders